is a railway station on the Jōhana Line in city of Tonami, Toyama, Japan, operated by West Japan Railway Company (JR West).

Lines

Layout
The station has two ground-level opposed side platforms serving two tracks with an elevated station building. The station has a Midori no Madoguchi staffed ticket office.

Platforms

Adjacent stations

History
It was renamed to its present name on 10 November 1954. With the privatization of Japanese National Railways (JNR) on 1 April 1987, the station came under the control of JR West. A new station building was completed in April 1994.

Passenger statistics
In fiscal 2015, the station was used by an average of 1,189 passengers daily (boarding passengers only).

Surrounding area
Tonami General Hospital
Tonami Art Museum
Tonami Post Office

See also
 List of railway stations in Japan

References

External links

 

Railway stations in Toyama Prefecture
Stations of West Japan Railway Company
Railway stations in Japan opened in 1951
Jōhana Line
Tonami, Toyama